Rosthwaite, Cumbria may refer to two different settlements in the English county of Cumbria:

Rosthwaite, Borrowdale, Cumbria ( south of Keswick)
Rosthwaite, Broughton, Cumbria ( north-east of Broughton-in-Furness)